Madrassas of Pakistan are Islamic seminaries in Pakistan, known in Urdu as Madaris-e-Deeniya (literally: religious schools).
Most madrassas teach mostly Islamic subjects such as tafseer (interpretation of the Quran), hadith (thousands of sayings of Muhammad), fiqh (Islamic law) and Arabic (the language of the Quran); but include some non-Islamic subjects (such as logic, philosophy, mathematics), which enable students to understand the religious ones.
The number of madrassas grew dramatically during and since the rule of General Muhammad Zia-ul-Haq. They are especially popular among Pakistan's poorest families, in part because they feed and house their students. Estimates of the number of madrasas vary between 12,000 and 40,000. In some areas of Pakistan they outnumber the underfunded public schools.

Most madrassas in Pakistan are Sunni, follow the doctrine of the Deobandi sect and have educated the masses about the essentials and principles of their sectarian version of Islam, throughout Pakistan. An estimated 4–10 per cent of madrassas serve the minority Shia population. Additionally there are a number of Quran academies offering diplomas in Islamic courses.

For the majority of Pakistani families, madrassas may provide "the only realistic option" to educate their sons, but critics have complained that many madrassas offer almost no instruction beyond the memorizing of the Quran, and that they encourage extremism, as analysis of the profiles of suicide bombers who have struck in at least one region of Pakistan have found most attended madrasas.

History
The madaris rose as colleges of learning in the Islamic world in the 11th century, though there were institutions of learning earlier. They catered not only to the religious establishment, though that was the dominant influence over them, but also the secular one. To the latter they supplied physicians, administrative officials, judges and teachers.

Conditions in madrassas were "regularly condemned by human rights agencies" as "crowded and undisciplined" according to Gilles Kepel. A 1996 report of the Human Rights Commission of Pakistan, for example, complained of students being held "in chains".

After the September 11, 2001 attacks on the United States, American television commentators widely associated madrassas with violence or fundamentalism. Former Pakistani president Gen. Musharraf tried to introduce an element of nominal control as an overture to American pressure, which have by and large been considered a failure.

Growth of madrassas
Estimates of the numbers of madrassas vary, but all agree their number has grown enormously, having expanded greatly during and after the rule of President General Zia-ul-Haq (1977–1988), who initially funded Deobandi madrassas with funds from his compulsory zakat collection which began in 1980.
Another benefactor was Saudi Arabia who, starting in the mid-1980s, sought to counteract help the Islamist Islamic Republic of Iran was giving to the assertive Shia minority in Pakistan, with "substantial funds" to expand conservative Sunni madrassas.

According to The News International, in 1947 there were only 189 madrassas in Pakistan but "over 40,000" by 2008.
According to David Commins book, The Wahhabi Mission and Saudi Arabia, their number grew from around 900 in 1971 to over 8,000 official ones and another 25,000 unofficial ones in 1988.
In 2002 the country had 10,000-13,000 unregistered madrassas with an estimated 1.7 to 1.9 million students, according to Christopher Candland. According to the New York Times, as of 2009 there more than 12,000 registered madrasas and more unregistered ones in Pakistan. In some areas of Pakistan they outnumber the underfunded public schools.

In 2020 it was reported that there are more than 22,000 registered madrassas (with many more unregistered) teaching more than 2 million children.

Curriculum

Most madrasas teach mostly Islamic subjects such as memorization of the Quran, Tafseer (Interpretation of the Quran), Hadith (thousands of sayings of Muhammad), usul ul hadith (rules of hadith), Fiqh and Usul ul fiqh (Islamic jurisprudence and principles of Islamic jurisprudence), Sarf and Nahw (branches of Arabic grammar), Arabic language, Islamic finance, Mantiq (logic), philosophy, classic Arabic literature and eloquence. Mastery of these subjects qualifies a student to become an Islamic scholar or cleric (maulvi or maulana).

In terms of religious doctrine, many of the madrasas are funded by Saudis groups and combine Deobandi ideology with "Wahhabism as reflected in the education imparted to students in Saudi Arabia government." Critics complain on intolerance in teachings as reflected in the line that "Muslim pupils in radical madrassas chant at the morning assembly: 'When people deny our faith, ask them to convert and if they don't destroy them utterly.'" Other Saudi madrassas, particularly schools in Afghan refugee camps, may provide an interpretation of Islam that "blends Pushtun ideals and Deobandi views, precisely the hallmark of the Taliban." The vast expansion of madrasas during the 1980s meant a shortage of qualified teachers such that "quite a few teachers did not discern between tribal values of their ethnic group, the Pushtuns and the religious ideals."

Madrassas teach Arabic and while there are over 70 languages in Pakistan, few Pakistanis speak Arabic. The Economist found that of the children who complete five years of primary school, only half are literate.

Importance

Social bonding and obedience
Providing free room and board to impoverished students, and shelter from the privations of poverty, the primarily Deobandi madrassas had a powerful esprit de corps. After many years in "conditions of intense intimacy" with little or no contact with the outside world, Madrassa students tended to be "extremely devoted" to their teachers. The strict doctrinaire teaching based on memorization discouraged even "the smallest expression of free thought or individual will", and gave root to fanaticism and a willingness to fight "anyone designated" an unbeliever by the master—whether a Shiite neighbor, Indian soldiers, even other Sunni Muslims.

Social mobility
The madrassas have been called "the only realistic option" for the majority of Pakistani families to provide education for their sons. Another source (Sadakat Kadri) has stated that "absent an educational Marshall Plan, the hope of educating a literate breadwinner is about as bright a future as millions of families will ever get," and that the schools offer "shelter from the social storm ... camaraderie instead of chaos," for lower middle class Pakistanis.
In some areas of Pakistan they outnumber the underfunded public schools.

Jihadi recruitment
A 2008 US diplomatic cable expressed alarm that Saudi Arabian-financed madrassas were fostering "religious radicalism" in "previously moderate regions of Pakistan" as children from impoverished families were sent to isolated madrassas, and once there often recruited for "martyrdom operations". 
“Graduates” of the madrassas are supposedly either retained as teachers for the next generation of recruits, or are sent to a sort-of postgraduate school for jihadi training. “Teachers at the madrassa appear to make the decision,” of where the students go next, “based on their read of the child’s willingness to engage in violence and acceptance of jihadi culture versus his utility as an effective proponent of Deobandi or Ahl-e-Hadith ideology/recruiter.”

The spring break for Pakistani Madrassas is one of the key factors in the beginning of the annual Afghanistan fighting season.

All-female madrassas

There are almost 2,000 registered Islamic religious schools for girls, educating almost a quarter of a million young women and providing more than half of the candidates sitting graduate-level exams every year. Oxford academic, Dr Masooda Bano has said that the madrassas gave women economic and social opportunities.

Influence 
The tens of thousands of pupils and graduates of Deobandi madrassas gave that school of Islam the ability to "intervene directly" in Pakistani political life and "to contest everything that appeared to compromise their view of the Islamic world order," according to political scientist Gilles Kepel.

Post 9/11 oversight
After the September 11, 2001 attacks on the United States, the US government encouraged former Pakistani president Gen. Musharraf to do something about Madrassas. Musharraf tried to introduce an element of nominal control. Two laws were passed: one to create state-controlled madrassas (model: Dini Madaris, 2001); the other to register and control them (2002). The first had moderate success, as some religious institutions registered in 2003 with the Pakistan Madrasah Education Board created by this law. However, the three alternative institutions it created suffer from organizational difficulties. The second measure proved unpopular with the madrassas, but the government has restricted some access of foreign students to the madaris education system.

Madrassas in Pakistan have been used to recruit jihadists and as a pretext to finance militancy as has been mentioned in the 9/11 Commission Report. For example, officials with the Lashkar-e-Taiba's charity wing, Jamaat-ud-Dawa, travelled to Saudi Arabia seeking donations for new schools, vastly inflating the schools costs to the donors – then siphoned off the excess money to fund militant operations.

Overseeing bodies
Ittehad-e-Tanzeemat-Madaris Pakistan is a federation of the five waqfs (seminary boards) in Pakistan, representing the different schools of Islam – AhleSunnat Wal Jamaat Deoband, AhleSunnat Barelwi, Ahl-e Hadith, Shia and Jamaat-e-Islami. Muhammad Muneeb ur Rehman is the president of Ittehad Tanzimat Madaris-e-Deeniya Pakistan.

Comparative studies
In addition to the South Asian Dars-i-Nizami curriculum, the students read books in Urdu as part of comparative religion or training in the beliefs of the sub-sect (maslak). These texts are taught in a manner in order to promote understanding of differences and similarities as they exist, with the stated goal of respect for human diversity. Subjects such as Western ideologies — capitalism, individualism, freedom, feminism, socialism, democracy, human rights are discussed in the context of how they relate to the Muslim thought and identity prevalent in the schools.

See also
 Blasphemy in Pakistan
 Education in Pakistan
 Freedom of religion in Pakistan
 International propagation of Salafism and Wahhabism by region#Pakistan
 Islam in Pakistan
 Islamic schools and branches
 Islamization in Pakistan
 Pakistani textbooks controversy
 Sectarian violence in Pakistan

Pakistan madrassas
 Darul 'Uloom Karachi, Karachi
 Jamia Faridia, Islamabad
 Jamia Muhammadia, Islamabad
 Darul Uloom Haqqania, Khyber Pakhtunkhwa
 Jamia-tur-Rasheed, Karachi
 Jamia Binori Town, Karachi
 Jamia Al-Kauthar, Islamabad
 Jamia islamia, Mirpur, Azad Kashmir
 Jamia imdadia, Faisalabad
 Jamia Naeemia , Lahore
 Jamia Ashrafia, Lahore

References

Further reading

 Ali, Saleem H. 2009. "Islam and Education: Conflict and Conformity in Pakistan's Madrassas." Oxford University Press.
 Candland, Christopher. 2005. ‘Pakistan’s Recent Experience in Reforming Islamic Education’. In Hathaway, Robert. M (ed). 2005. Education Reform in Pakistan: Building for the Future Washington D.C: Woodrow Wilson International Center for Scholars. pp. 151–165.
 Hartung, Jan-Peter and Reifeld, Helmut. 2006. Islamic Education, Diversity and National Identity New Delhi: Sage.
 
 Makdisi, George. 1981. The Rise of Colleges: Institutions of Learning in Islam and the West Edinburgh: Edinburgh University Press.
 Malik, Jamal, ed. 2008. Madrasas in South Asia: Teaching Terror?. London and New York: Routledge.
 Malik, Jamal, 1996. Colonialization of Islam: Dissolution of Traditional Institutions in Pakistan. New Delhi: Manohar Publications, and Lahore: Vanguard Ltd.
 
 Rahman, Tariq. 2004. Denizens of Alien Worlds: A Study of Education, Inequality and Polarization in Pakistan Karachi: Oxford University Press. Chapter 5.
 Robinson, Francis. 2002. The Ulama of Farangi Mahal and Islamic Culture in South Asia Lahore: Ferozsons.

 
Islam in Pakistan